Bobești may refer to:

Bobești, a village in Duda-Epureni Commune, Vaslui County, Romania
Bobești, the Romanian name of Bobivtsi, Chernivtsi Oblast, Ukraine 
Bobești, a former village in Glina, Ilfov, Romania